is a fighting game developed by CyberConnect2 and published by Bandai Namco Entertainment for PlayStation 3. Based on Hirohiko Araki's long-running manga series JoJo' s Bizarre Adventure, the game allows players to compete against each other using 40 characters taken from the first eight story arcs, as well as one guest character from another manga also created by Araki. The game was released in Japan on August 29, 2013, and was released internationally in late April 2014.

A remaster featuring additional content, titled  was released for Nintendo Switch, PlayStation 4, PlayStation 5, Xbox One, Xbox Series X/S, and Microsoft Windows via Steam on September 2, 2022.

Gameplay

JoJo's Bizarre Adventure: All Star Battle is a 3D fighting game in which players can fight against each other using characters taken from the first eight story arcs of Hirohiko Araki's JoJo's Bizarre Adventure manga series (and one from a prior work by Araki), fighting in various locations taken from the manga. Like most fighting games, the aim is to defeat your opponent by draining their stamina gauge (HP is used in a certain game mode) with various attacks and special techniques. The player wins a round by draining all of their opponent's stamina, or by possessing more stamina than their opponent when time runs out. Gameplay uses five main buttons; light, medium, and heavy attacks, a dodge button, and a "Style" button. Along with the ability to use various special attacks and techniques with different directional inputs, each character possesses a Battle Style, allowing them to utilize additional moves with the "Style" button. Styles fall into one of six, later seven main categories: Ripple, Vampirism, Mode, Stand, Mounted, Baoh Armed Phenomenon, and Ogre Street, each utilizing different abilities when the Style button is pressed. For example, Ripple users can use the power of the Ripple to augment the strength of their attacks, whilst Stand users can summon out their Stand, giving them additional move types whilst also making themselves more vulnerable.

Players can decrease their opponent's Heart Heat Gauge by using taunts when they are knocked down. Players can also use Flash Cancels to deplete their own Heart Heat Gauge to cancel their current combo attack and chain into a new one. The Heart Heat Gauge is also used in some Battle Styles and certain special techniques. , similar to the "Blazing Fists Match" system of Capcom's 1998 fighting game based on the series, occurs when two "Rush" attacks collide with each other, beginning a button mashing minigame. Novice players can use the  system, which allows them to more easily string together combos and techniques by using only a single button. The Guard Gauge is also depleted by Stylish Evades, special dodges that when executed properly make the character perform one of their iconic poses from the manga. The remaster adds three new mechanics; Assist Attacks, in which players can summon another character for an attack, Air Dash, which lets fighters dash in the air, and Stylish Guard, which lets players dodge attacks at the last second. 

Each of the game's stages, based on locations from the manga, feature battleground gimmicks which trigger when a character is knocked down onto a certain area, causing hazards such as a speeding chariot to run characters down or a rain of poison dart frogs to induce a poison status. There are also Dramatic Finishes, which trigger when a player is defeated by a super move in a certain area, replicating scenes from the manga.

Game modes

All Star Battle features many different game modes. Story Mode is a single player option that allows players to go through an original story inspired by the first eight parts of the manga, with the eighth part featuring the protagonists of all eight parts. Players control the protagonists of the series, partly reenacting various scenes from the manga. After completing a Part's Story Mode once, a new option known as Another Battle opens up, allowing the player to play as the opposite character in the Story Mode matches, taking on the role of the series' antagonists. It is only through Story Mode that additional on-disc characters are unlocked through play.

Campaign Mode is an online mode where players can unlock items known as Customize Medals which allow them to change the preset appearance and mannerisms of their unlocked characters. Campaign Mode also features several random events that can assist the player in either Vision or Boss matches, such as Rudol von Stroheim depleting the opponent's health bar, Cioccolata increasing the rate at which Boss HP is depleted when more Energy is used, or Ken Oyanagi offering the player a game of rock-paper-scissors to confirm that the next match will be a Boss match of the player's choice. The player can receive Energy as a result of a random event, or it can be purchased via microtransactions. 

Versus Mode features both local offline play and online play in either free battles or ranked matches which affect a player's Battle Score. The Western version of the game adds an Arcade Mode, in which the player faces up against eight computer-controlled opponents.

In the remaster, the Story and Campaign modes are replaced by All-Star Battle mode, which features 100 battles, featuring battles from the manga (with each page featured a boss battle against an antagonist of a particular part) and original "what-if" battles (with the eighth part only focusing on the original "what-if" battles against the protagonists of the first seven parts, with the protagonist of Baoh as the boss of that part), with unique conditions through which players can unlock costumes and background music. The Versus mode now features 3-on-3 team battles and a tournament function.

Battle Styles
Characters each possess one of five main , reflecting the origins of their own abilities from the manga's continuity, although some characters may possess aspects of the other Battle Styles.
: Ripple users can use Ripple breathing to recharge their Heart Heat Gauge or utilize the Ripple in stronger versions of their special attacks. Such attacks will impart unhealable damage to a Vampire or Pillar Men's stamina.
: Dio Brando's Vampiric powers allow him to use draining attacks to restore his stamina and Heart Heat Gauge. When he receives damage, a percentage is shown in silver and this will heal over time unless said damage is inflicted by special attacks from Ripple users or subsequent damage is taken, resetting the restorable health.
: The Pillar Men can activate their respective Modes, which increases their power but drains their Heart Heat Gauge, and when the Heart Heat Gauge runs out they become vulnerable. They also possess a more powerful form of their Mode which increases their power further. However, they will become vulnerable for a longer period of time when running out of Heart Heat Gauge. Like Vampires, the Pillar Men also receive healable silver damage unless they are struck by Ripple attacks.
: Stand users can bring out their respective Stand at will, offering different movesets and special attacks. They also possess a unique  ability that allows them to unsync with the Stand mid combo to begin a new combo. Some characters possess Stands that are always active and have different play styles than other Stand using characters. For example, Jotaro Kujo's Star Platinum is toggled on or off by the player while Hol Horse's Emperor is always active.
: Characters Mounted on horseback have the ability to call their horse at will, offering up different movesets on or off their horses. These characters also possess Stands, but they are only seen during certain moves.
: As he is in a symbiotic relationship with a parasite known as Baoh, Ikuro Hashizawa possesses a unique Battle Style that makes his body transform to suit his needs. Every 25% of his health gauge he loses activates a new benefit: gradual stamina recovery, increased attack strength, and a combination of the Rumbling and Resolve Modes of other characters. If his opponent is using a move that increases their strength temporarily (such as Ermes's Kiss Stickers or Giorno's Gold Experience Requiem), Baoh gains the ability to dodge more easily.
: A style unique to All Star Battle R, used exclusively by new character Speedwagon. His playstyle allows him to summon his two allies from Ogre Street, Tattoo and an unnamed Kempo Master, who can perform ranged attacks that can be chained into combos.
: A style unique to All Star Battle R, used exclusively by new character Prosciutto. His playstyle allows him to switch between executing combo attacks with his partner, Pesci, and attacking with his Stand Grateful Dead directly.
: A style unique to All Star Battle R, used exclusively by new character Stroheim. His playstyle allows him to use his cybernetic enhancements in various ways, such as attacking with a machine gun in his torso or launching his prostetic hand. Most notably, Stroheim can equip and unequip the UV lasers attached to his shoulders at any time, allowing him to deal rapid damage until the lasers run out of energy.

Both Vampires and the Pillar Men are limited to nighttime or indoor stages until certain qualifications are met in Story Mode. They also all possess a unique animation for the Dramatic Finish on Part 3's DIO's Mansion stage.

Several characters possess unique additional status bars or icons. These include Guido Mista's available ammunition and members of Sex Pistols, Enrico Pucci's 14 Words to switch between Whitesnake and C-Moon, or Gyro's Steel Balls and Rotation energy. Characters from Part 7 Steel Ball Run have a shared unique status bar which represents how many parts of the  they possess; for example, one piece allows Gyro to use the Scan move, two pieces allow Johnny to automatically restore his fingernail bullets (otherwise requiring a special move to activate), while all three pieces enable Valentine to use D4C -Love Train- which makes him immune to projectile attacks, particularly those from Johnny and Gyro.

Characters

There are a total of 32 playable characters available on the game disc, with 14 available from the start. Nine additional characters were made available as DLC, eventually bringing the total number of characters to 41. One of these downloadable characters, Ikuro Hashizawa, makes a guest appearance from Hirohiko Araki's earlier manga series, Baoh.

Ten additional characters were added for the remastered release, bringing the total to 51 initial characters. Most of these newcomers in All-Star Battle R originate from CyberConnect2's subsequent JoJo game, Eyes of Heaven. Four additional characters are set to be added to the remaster as post-launch downloadable content via a season pass, with two others added as free DLC.

Part 1 Phantom Blood
Jonathan Joestar (voice: Kazuyuki Okitsu), Ripple
Will A. Zeppeli (voice: Yoku Shioya), Ripple
Robert E. O. Speedwagon (voice: Yoji Ueda), Ogre Street
Dio Brando (voice: Takehito Koyasu), Vampirism
Part 2 Battle Tendency
Joseph Joestar (voice: Tomokazu Sugita), Ripple
Caesar Anthonio Zeppeli (voice: Takuya Satō), Ripple
Lisa Lisa (voice: Atsuko Tanaka), Ripple
Rudol von Stroheim (voice: Atsushi Imaruoka), Best Science in the World
Esidisi (voice: Keiji Fujiwara), Heat Mode
Wamuu (voice: Akio Ōtsuka), Wind Mode
Kars (voice: Kazuhiko Inoue), Light Mode
Part 3 Stardust Crusaders
Jotaro Kujo (voice: Daisuke Ono), Stand: Star Platinum
Old Joseph Joestar (voice: Tomokazu Sugita / Unshō Ishizuka), Stand: Hermit Purple
Muhammad Avdol (voice: Masashi Ebara / Kenta Miyake), Stand: Magician's Red
Noriaki Kakyoin (voice: Kōji Yusa / Daisuke Hirakawa), Stand: Hierophant Green
Jean Pierre Polnareff (voice: Hiroaki Hirata / Fuminori Komatsu), Stand: Silver Chariot
Iggy (voice: Shigeru Chiba / Misato Fukuen), Stand: The Fool
Hol Horse (voice: Hōchū Ōtsuka / Hidenobu Kiuchi), Stand: Emperor
Mariah (voice: Ayahi Takagaki), Stand: Bastet
Pet Shop, Stand: Horus
Vanilla Ice (voice: Hiroyuki Yoshino / Shō Hayami), Stand: Cream
DIO (voice: Takehito Koyasu), Stand: The World
Part 4 Diamond Is Unbreakable
Josuke Higashikata (voice: Wataru Hatano / Yūki Ono), Stand: Crazy Diamond
Okuyasu Nijimura (voice: Wataru Takagi), Stand: The Hand
Koichi Hirose (voice: Romi Park / Yūki Kaji), Stand: Echoes Act 1, 2, and 3
Rohan Kishibe (voice: Hiroshi Kamiya / Takahiro Sakurai), Stand: Heaven's Door
Jotaro Kujo (Part 4)  (voice: Daisuke Ono), Stand: Star Platinum - The World
Keicho Nijimura (voice: Tomoyuki Shimura), Stand: Bad Company
Yukako Yamagishi (voice: Mamiko Noto), Stand: Love Deluxe
Shigekiyo "Shigechi" Yangu (voice: Kappei Yamaguchi), Stand: Harvest
Akira Otoishi (voice: Showtaro Morikubo), Stand: Red Hot Chili Pepper
Yoshikage Kira (voice: Rikiya Koyama / Toshiyuki Morikawa), Stand: Killer Queen
Kosaku Kawajiri (voice: Rikiya Koyama / Toshiyuki Morikawa), Stand: Killer Queen

Part 5 Vento Auero / Golden Wind
Giorno Giovanna (voice: Daisuke Namikawa / Kenshō Ono), Stand: Gold Experience / Gold Experience Requiem (voice: Misa Watanabe / Kenshō Ono)
Bruno Bucciarati (voice: Noriaki Sugiyama / Yūichi Nakamura), Stand: Sticky Fingers
Narancia Ghirga (voice: Yuuko Sanpei / Daiki Yamashita), Stand: Aerosmith
Guido Mista (voice: Kenji Akabane / Kōsuke Toriumi), Stand: Sex Pistols (voice: Asami Imai / Kōsuke Toriumi)
Pannacotta Fugo (voice: Hisafumi Oda / Junya Enoki), Stand: Purple Haze (voice: Hisao Egawa / Junya Enoki) / Purple Haze Distortion (voice: Hisao Egawa / Junya Enoki)
Trish Una (voice: Sayaka Senbongi), Stand: Spice Girl
Prosciutto and Pesci (voice: Takuma Terashima and Shinya Fukumatsu / Tatsuhisa Suzuki and Subaru Kimura), Stand: The Grateful Dead and Beach Boy
Ghiaccio (voice: Tatsuhisa Suzuki / Nobuhiko Okamoto), Stand: White Album
Risotto Nero (voice: Shinshū Fuji), Stand: Metallica
Diavolo (voice: Toshiyuki Morikawa / Katsuyuki Konishi), Stand: King Crimson
Part 6 Stone Ocean
Jolyne Cujoh (voice: Miyuki Sawashiro / Fairouz Ai), Stand: Stone Free
Ermes Costello (voice: Chizu Yonemoto / Mutsumi Tamura), Stand: Kiss
Foo Fighters (voice: Ryoko Shiraishi / Mariya Ise), Stand: Foo Fighters
Narciso Anasui (voice: Yūichi Nakamura / Daisuke Namikawa), Stand: Diver Down
Weather Report (voice: Tōru Ōkawa / Yūichirō Umehara), Stand: Weather Report/Heavy Weather
Enrico Pucci (voice: Shō Hayami / Tomokazu Seki), Stand: Whitesnake (voice: Takuya Kirimoto / Tomokazu Seki) / C-Moon (voice: Takuya Kirimoto) / Made in Heaven
Enrico Pucci (Final) (voice: Tomokazu Seki), Stand: Whitesnake (voice: Tomokazu Seki) / C-Moon (voice: Tomokazu Seki) / Made in Heaven
Part 7 Steel Ball Run
Johnny Joestar (voice: Yūki Kaji), Mounted: Horse Slow Dancer and Stand Tusk Act 1, 2, 3, and 4
Gyro Zeppeli (voice: Shin-ichiro Miki), Mounted: Horse Valkyrie and Stand Scan / Ball Breaker
Diego Brando (voice: Takehito Koyasu), Mounted: Horse Silver Bullet and Stand Scary Monsters
Funny Valentine (voice: Yasuyuki Kase), Stand: Dirty Deeds Done Dirt Cheap (D4C)
Part 8 JoJolion
Josuke Higashikata (voice: Mitsuaki Madono), Stand: Soft & Wet
Baoh
Ikuro Hashizawa (voice: Kōki Uchiyama), Baoh Armed Phenomenon

Notes

International edition name changes

Many non-playable characters appear throughout the game. Dialogue for all characters in the game are quotes from the original manga or related works, such as the light novels. The voice cast of the first season of the anime series reprise their roles for the game; the remastered release expands this to the voice cast of the first five seasons.

Stages
The various stages in All Star Battle are all modeled after a particular scene in the manga.
Part 1 Phantom Blood
: From JoJo's Bizarre Adventure Volume 5 The Final Ripple
Part 2 Battle Tendency
: From JoJo's Bizarre Adventure Volume 11 The Warrior Returning to the Wind
Part 3 Stardust Crusaders
: From JoJo's Bizarre Adventure Volume 26 The Miasma of the Void, Vanilla Ice
: From JoJo's Bizarre Adventure Volume 27 DIO's World and Volume 28 The Long Journey Ends, Goodbye My Friends
: From JoJo's Bizarre Adventure Volume 28 The Long Journey Ends, Goodbye My Friends
Part 4 Diamond Is Unbreakable
: From JoJo's Bizarre Adventure Volume 32 Yukako Yamagishi Falls in Love
: From JoJo's Bizarre Adventure Volume 39 A Father's Tears
: From JoJo's Bizarre Adventure Volume 45 Another One Bites the Dust, Volume 46 Crazy Diamond Is Unbreakable, and Volume 47 Goodbye, Morioh - The Golden Heart
Parte 5 Vento Auero / Golden Wind
: From JoJo's Bizarre Adventure Volume 52 Express Train to Florence and Volume 53 The Grateful Dead
: From JoJo's Bizarre Adventure Volume 60 Meet the Man in the Colosseum!
: From JoJo's Bizarre Adventure Volume 61 His Name Is Diavolo
Part 6 Stone Ocean
: From Stone Ocean Volume 6 Torrential Downpour Warning
: From Stone Ocean Volume 4 Go, Foo Fighters!
: From Stone Ocean Volume 16 At Cape Canaveral and Volume 17 Made in Heaven
Part 7 Steel Ball Run
: From Steel Ball Run Volume 6 Scary Monsters 
: From Steel Ball Run Volume 20 Love Train - The World Is One
Part 8 JoJolion
: From JoJolion Volume 1 Welcome to Morioh Town

 Remaster exclusive.
 To avoid revealing plot information from the Stone Ocean anime adaptation's final episodes, this stage was excluded in the initial release of All Star Battle R, but  was added back on December 1, 2022 to coincide with the finale.

Downloadable content

PlayStation 3
Several downloadable content campaigns were released. The first online campaign, was made available at launch, featuring the downloadable characters Yoshikage Kira and Shigekiyo Yangu. The second online campaign, added the downloadable characters Iggy and Pannacotta Fugo. The third campaign, added downloadable characters LisaLisa and Joseph Joestar as seen in Stardust Crusaders. The fourth campaign, added characters Vanilla Ice and Narsico Anasui. The fifth and final campaign, added Ikuro Hashizawa as a downloadable character. On December 3, 2013, Yoshikage Kira was made available for purchase.

December 19, 2013, saw the beginning of a collaboration with the HD version of JoJo's Bizarre Adventure: Heritage for the Future, allowing players to download alternate costumes for Jotaro Kujo and Jean Pierre Polnareff based on promotional artwork for the original arcade game.

Remastered
Four paid downloadable characters are planned for the remastered version of the game. The first of these downloadable characters, Risotto Nero from Golden Wind, was revealed on October 7, 2022 and was released on October 28, 2022. The second character, Rudol von Stroheim from Battle Tendency, was revealed on January 19, 2023 and was released on February 3, 2023. The thrid character, Keicho Nijimura from Diamond Is Unbreakable, was revealed on March 3, 2023 and will be released on March 24, 2023. A season pass is available for the game, which offers early access to each of the four planned paid downloadable characters for the game as well as an additional pair of costumes for Rohan Kishibe and Muhammad Avdol.

On November 5, 2022, two free downloadable characters, Weather Report and Enrico Pucci (Final) (the latter is original ASB version of Pucci) from Stone Ocean, were revealed to be coming to the game alongside the original game's Kennedy Space Center stage, to coincide with the release of the final episodes of Stone Ocean anime adaptation. Both the characters and the stage were released on December 1, 2022.

All Star Battle League
As a way to promote the video game, Namco Bandai and CyberConnect2 performed a series of Livestream broadcasts called  during July and August 2013. During the broadcasts, Bandai Namco producer Noriaki Niino, CyberConnect2 producer Hiroshi Matsuyama, and comedian and JoJo fan Kendo Kobayashi hosted a tournament between the computer controlled characters to display gameplay. There were six sets of preliminary matches where characters were grouped together randomly, with the top two characters out of each group moving onto the quarter finals. A seventh group consisting of the last characters to be announced and a fan favorite from the previous groups was run, with the winner joining the other twelve characters. Several fan favorite characters were included as seats. The sixteen characters then were put into a tournament bracket, with the winner of the All Star Battle League ultimately being DIO. To commemorate the victory, a special PlayStation 3 theme featuring DIO and his Stand The World was made available.

Development
All Star Battle was first announced in July 2012. The game's voice cast features the same voice cast from the anime for the first two parts while the remaining six parts feature an original voice cast.

The game is sold as both a standard edition and a limited edition , which contains a gold plate etching of Giorno Giovanna and his Stand Gold Experience, a figure statue of Jotaro Kujo and his Stand Star Platinum, and the game's original soundtrack on a CD resembling the power of the Stand Whitesnake. First edition pressings of both the standard and limited editions include a memo pad designed to look like Part 4 supporting character Hayato Kawajiri under the thrall of Rohan Kishibe's Heaven's Door Stand and a download code to access the character Yoshikage Kira. In the seventh promotional video for the games, Namco Bandai announced it would be providing all downloadable characters for half-price through September 25, 2013, due to the preorders. At the 2013 Tokyo Game Show, Namco Bandai made another announcement that they would be continuing this half-price campaign through at least Campaign 3; in an announcement for a new patch, it was revealed the campaign would run through December 2, 2013.

On September 19, 2013, Namco Bandai Games announced it would be releasing the game internationally in 2014, with a release date of Spring 2014 announced for Europe. The game will have localized names for some of the characters, with the publisher working with Shueisha to ensure names fit with Hirohiko Araki's intentions "while not offending any party", and will match with the North American and European releases of the recent anime series for consistency. In late January 2014, it was announced that All Star Battle would be given a limited physical release in the United States through Amazon.com and ClubNamco.com, as well a release on the PlayStation Network. The game will also include a new Arcade Mode not found in the Japanese release featuring the player fighting eight CPU-controlled characters that will occasionally enter a "Harvest" mode to connect online and get more gold (the in-game currency). The release also includes all of the patches released for the Japanese version. The European release of the games will also feature a limited edition release, dubbed the "Exquisite Edition", which in addition to a physical copy of the game includes a figurine of Jotaro Kujo and Star Platinum studded with 6000 Swarovski crystals, which will receive a limited release and be auctioned off for charity through GamesAid. Another Exquisite Edition was sold at auction during the 2014 Anime Expo, with proceeds going to a local children's hospital.

Remaster
A remaster of the game, titled JoJo's Bizarre Adventure: All-Star Battle R, was announced on March 9, 2022 during a PlayStation "State of Play" livestream. It was created to celebrate the manga's 35th anniversary and the anime's 10th anniversary. The remaster features revised single-player modes, new gameplay mechanics, and additional playable characters and stages. Every character from the first six parts (mainly most characters from Part 3, as well as every character from Parts 4, 5 and 6) have also received re-recorded voice overs by the voice cast from the anime, replacing some of the game's original voice cast, while characters from the remaining two parts have also received re-recorded voice overs from the game's original voice cast with the characters' designs also updated to more closely resemble the anime.

On May 26, 2022, Bandai Namco Entertainment released the Street Date Announcement trailer, which confirmed a September 2, 2022 release date for the game, as well as a season pass, a Digital Deluxe Edition and a Collector's Edition, which comes with the Digital Deluxe Edition bonus, the pre-order bonus, and a figure of Jolyne Cujoh in all regions, with an additional mug shot placard included in the European edition. In Europe and Japan, the season pass also comes bundled with the Collector's Edition, with the Japanese edition additionally including the game's official soundtrack in a digital-only format.

An early access demo of the game was available on the PlayStation 5 and PlayStation 4 on June 16, 2022. The demo featured a limited character roster and a single stage, with only online mode and practice mode being available. Access to the demo ended on June 22, 2022, with a feedback survey available to take afterward to July 6th, 2022.

The remaster was released on September 2, 2022 for Nintendo Switch, PlayStation 4, PlayStation 5, Xbox One, Xbox Series X/S, and Microsoft Windows via Steam.

Reception

Playstation 3
Famitsu gave All Star Battle a perfect 40/40. The game was a winner in the "Future" division of the 2012 "Japan Game Awards". The game sold over 500,000 pre-orders, and Namco Bandai producer Noriaki Niino thanked the fans of the manga series for making the game such a success. In an import review, Kotaku praised the game for its imagination and faithfulness to the source material, but acknowledged glaring problems such as balance issues and Campaign Mode's structure that leans towards microtransaction-type social games. In response to such criticisms domestically, CyberConnect2 released an update to the system to address balance problems on September 11, 2013, with a second update to further address these issues for October 2013; the recharge rate for Energy in Campaign Mode was also sped up to five minutes from 20 minutes starting September 6, 2013, without any announced final date and several items that would have been paid for were made free. Two more character balancing updates were released up through November 2013, during which time the Campaign Mode was updated to make five minutes the new permanent recharge rate. As of March 31, 2014, the game has shipped 700,000 copies.

Remaster
According to review aggregate website Metacritic, the Xbox Series X version received "generally favorable reviews", while the other versions received "mixed to average reviews".

Notes

Translation changes

References

External links

Official Website (All Star Battle R)

2013 video games
CyberConnect2 games
Bandai Namco games
All Star Battle
Multiplayer and single-player video games
PlayStation 3 games
PlayStation 4 games
PlayStation 5 games
Fighting games
3D fighting games
Nintendo Switch games
Video games developed in Japan
Windows games
Xbox One games
Xbox Series X and Series S games
Japan Game Awards' Game of the Year winners